The Institute of Forensic Science, Mumbai (IFSC Mumbai) is an institute of higher education in Mumbai, India which offers courses leading to a BSc degree in forensic science and a Master of Forensic Science (two years). The second year is specialisation in various branches of forensics and a postgraduate diploma in forensic science and related law, and a postgraduate diploma in digital and cyber forensic and related law. 
IFSC Mumbai is housed on the grounds of the Institute of Science, an institute for postgraduate teaching and research.

Education in Mumbai
Forensics organizations
Medical education in India